USNS Pollux (T-AK-290), later T-AKR-290, the fourth United States Navy ship of the name, is an Algol-class vehicle cargo ship that is currently maintained by the United States Maritime Administration as part of the Ready Reserve Force (RRF) as SS Pollux (T-AKR-290).

In keeping with the pattern of the naming the Algol-class ships after bright stars, the Pollux was named after Pollux, a star in the northern constellation of Gemini.

Construction and early career
The ship was built as the high speed container ship SS Sea-Land Market, USCG ON 550721, IMO 7319632, by A.G. Weser in Bremen, West Germany, hull no. 1384, for Sea-Land Service, Inc.  Launched on 1 May 1973, she was delivered to Sea-Land on 1 September 1973. Due to her high operating cost, she proved uneconomical for commercial use. Sea-Land sold her to the United States Navy on 16 November 1981.

The U.S. Navy classified the ship as a cargo ship (AK), assigned her to the Military Sealift Command for non-commissioned service, and renamed her USNS Pollux (T-AK-290). In September 1992, the Navy reclassified her as roll-on/roll-off vehicle cargo ship and redesignated her as T-AKR-290.

Conversion
Polluxs conversion into a vehicle cargo ship began on 28 July 1984 at Avondale Shipyards in New Orleans, Louisiana.  Her cargo hold was redesigned into a series of decks connected by ramps so vehicles can be driven into and out of the cargo hold for fast loading and unloading.  She was also fitted with two pairs of cranes, one pair amidships capable of lifting , and the other pair aft capable of lifting .  When her conversion was complete, Avondale delivered her to the Military Sealift Command on 31 March 1986.

Service
When not active, Pollux was kept in a reduced operating status due to her high operating cost.  If needed, she could be activated and ready to move in 96 hours.

Pollux took part in the Persian Gulf War in 1990-1991.  Along with the other seven Algol class vehicle cargo ships, she transported 14 percent of all cargo transported between the United States and Saudi Arabia during and after the war.

She was in Boston's Dry Dock Number 3 as of 10/28/14.

As of 1/23/18  http://www.marinetraffic.com/en/ais/details/ships/shipid:455429/mmsi:368989000/imo:7319632/vessel:POLLUX

As of 8/26/2022, according to the website https://www.marinetraffic.com/ she is moored in McFadden Bend of the Neches River, Port Neches, Texas.

Transfer to Maritime Administration and Ready Reserve Force

On 1 October 2007, Pollux was transferred to the United States Maritime Administration.  On 1 October 2008, she was transferred to the Ready Reserve Force, losing her "USNS" designation, and laid up at Philadelphia, Pennsylvania.  She can be reactivated in five days when needed. If activated again, Pollux will report to the Military Sealift Command.

References

 

Ships built in Bremen (state)
Cargo ships of the United States Navy
Algol-class vehicle cargo ships
1973 ships
Gulf War ships of the United States
Cold War auxiliary ships of the United States